Tritoniidae is a taxonomic family of nudibranchs in the suborder Cladobranchia, shell-less marine gastropod molluscs. This family includes some of the largest known nudibranchs, with the NE Atlantic species Tritonia hombergii reaching 20 cm in length. It is the only family in the monotypic superfamily Tritonioidea.

Distribution
These nudibranchs occur worldwide in warm and temperate seas and in the coldest waters and deep sea, wherever the octocorals which they eat are found.

Ecology
Members of the family Tritoniidae feed on octocorals, including sea pens, alcyonarian soft corals, and gorgonians, often being cryptic in shape and colouration upon them. They share this trait with the Arminidae which were previously thought to be only distantly related, but have been shown to be closely related to the Tritoniidae by a recent study.

Genera

The genera in the family Tritoniidae include:
 Duvaucelia Risso, 1826
 Marianina Pruvot-Fol, 1931
 Marionia Vayssiere, 1877
 Paratritonia Baba, 1949
 Tochuina Odhner, 1963 
 Tritonia Cuvier, 1798
 Tritonicula Korshunova & Martynov, 2020
 Tritonidoxa Bergh, 1907
 Tritoniella Eliot, 1907
 Tritoniopsis Eliot, 1905

References